Onema Grace Geyoro (born 2 July 1997) is a professional footballer who plays as a defensive midfielder for French Division 1 Féminine club Paris Saint-Germain, which she also captains. Born in the Democratic Republic of the Congo, she plays for the France national team.

Club career

Youth
Geyoro was born in Kolwezi and moved with her family from the Democratic Republic of the Congo to France when she was a baby. At the age of eight, she started playing with the boys of SMOC St Jean-de-Braye, based in Orléans. She was distinguished, along with 26 other people, by the Regional Olympic and Sports Committee of Orléans in January 2013.

Paris Saint-Germain
In 2012, at the age of 15, Geyoro joined the youth department of Paris Saint-Germain. She debuted for Paris Saint-Germain's senior team in October 2014 in a 2–0 victory over Issy, coming on as a substitute for Fatmire Alushi in the 76th minute. In March 2017, she signed a contract extension until June 2021. On 27 May 2018, Geyoro scored her debut goal for Paris Saint-Germain, scoring a brace in a 3–0 victory over Soyaux which guaranteed the club a spot at the 2018–19 UEFA Women's Champions League.

International career

Youth
In July 2012, Geyoro represented France under-16 at the 2012 Nordic Under-16 Cup. She played full matches in the 1–0 loss to Sweden, the 4–0 victory over Iceland, and the 3–0 victory over Norway. In the 5–1 victory over Finland she came on as a 52nd-minute substitute.

In March 2013, Geyoro represented France under-17 in the second round of the 2013 UEFA Women's Under-17 Championship qualification campaign, making one appearance as a substitute in the 2–0 victory over Finland.

In July 2015, Geyoro represented France under-19 at the 2015 UEFA Women's Under-19 Championship. In the group stage, she played full matches in the 1–0 victory over Denmark and in the 1–0 victory over Sweden, but sat on the bench for the 4–0 victory over Israel. She also sat on the bench for the semi-final against Spain, which France lost 5–4 in a penalty shoot-out.

In September 2015, Geyoro represented France under-19 in the qualifying round of the 2016 UEFA Women's Under-19 Championship. She played a full match in the 2–0 victory over Bosnia and Herzegovina, came on as a substitute in the 70th minute of the 7–0 victory over Faroe Islands, and played a full match and scored a goal in the 6–0 victory over Czech Republic. In April 2016, she was in France's squad for the elite qualification round, playing a full match in the 3–0 victory over Portugal and starting and scoring in the 2–0 victory over Scotland. In July 2016, played with France under-19 in the 2016 UEFA Women's Under-19 Championship. In the group stage she played all three matches, starting in the 1–0 loss to Norway, in the 6–0 victory over Slovakia, and in the 2–1 victory over Netherlands in which she scored the second goal. She played the full match of the semi-final 3–1 victory over Switzerland, and scored the first goal in the 2–1 victory over Spain in the final.

In March 2016 France under-19 competed in the 2016 La Manga Women Tournament, in which Geyoro started in the 2–1 victory over Norway, came on as a substitute in the 3–1 victory over Italy, and scored the only goal in the 1–0 victory over Sweden.

In November 2016, Geyoro was selected for France's squad for the 2016 FIFA U-20 Women's World Cup. She played in a friendly against Canada in Australia ahead of the tournament. In the tournament's group stage she played all 3 matches, with France drawing 0–0 against the United States and 2–2 against Ghana, before beating New Zealand 2–0 to qualify for the next stage. In the knock-out stage she played the full matches in the quarter-final 1–0 victory over Germany and in the semi-final 2–1 victory over Japan. In the final, Geyoro played the full match against North Korea and scored France's only goal in the 3–1 defeat. She was one of the only players to play every minute of the tournament.

Senior
On 22 January 2017, Geyoro debuted for the French senior team in a 2–0 friendly win over South Africa, coming on as a substitute for Sandie Toletti in the 69th minute. In March 2017, she represented France at the 2017 SheBelieves Cup, playing full matches in the 2–1 victory over England and in the 0–0 draw with Germany. In July 2017, she was selected for France's squad for UEFA Women's Euro 2017 and was the youngest player in the squad. She played full matches in the group stage 1–1 draws against Austria and Switzerland, as well as the 1–0 quarter-final loss to England. In March 2018, she represented France at the 2018 SheBelieves Cup, playing full matches in the 1–1 draw with the United States and in the 3–0 victory over Germany. On 4 March 2019, she scored her debut goal for the French senior team, converting the 4th goal in France's 6–0 victory over Uruguay.

Career statistics

Club

International

Scores and results list France's goal tally first, score column indicates score after each Geyoro goal.

Honours
Paris Saint-Germain
 Division 1 Féminine: 2020–21
 Coupe de France féminine: 2017–18, 2021–22
 UEFA Women's Champions League runner-up: 2014–15, 2016–17

References

External links
 
 Grace Geyoro at Footofeminin.fr 
 
 
 Grace Geyoro at Paris Saint-Germain 

1997 births
Living people
Women's association football midfielders
People from Kolwezi
French women's footballers
France women's youth international footballers
Democratic Republic of the Congo women's footballers
Democratic Republic of the Congo emigrants to France
French sportspeople of Democratic Republic of the Congo descent
Naturalized citizens of France
France women's international footballers
2019 FIFA Women's World Cup players
Division 1 Féminine players
Paris Saint-Germain Féminine players
Black French sportspeople
UEFA Women's Euro 2022 players
UEFA Women's Euro 2017 players